Muracypraea mus, common name the mouse cowry, is a species of sea snail, a cowry, a marine gastropod mollusk in the family Cypraeidae, the cowries.

This species was once considered to belong to the archaic genus Siphocypraea (which now includes only extinct species). In 2004 it was placed by Meyer in the specifically created genus Muracypraea  Woodring, 1957.

Description
They are pyriform, quite thick and heavy, almost swollen, with slightly square contours. The dorsum surface of these smooth and shiny shells is generally pale brown or beige, with a variable pattern of dark brown spots. The base may be pale brown or whitish, the poorly developed teeth are usually white or dark brown, the aperture is long and narrow. In the living cowries mantle and foot are well developed, with external antennae. Muracypraea mus is quite similar to Bernaya teulerei.

Distribution
Locus typicus of Cyp. mus tristensis: "Off Tucacas, Golfo de Triste, Venezuela."

These cowries live in the Southern Caribbean Sea, 
along northern Colombia and western Venezuela. 
Also recently discovered at Malmok, Aruba, at a depth of 30 metres.

Habitat
Muracypraea mus lives in tropical shallow water, generally in the low intertidal zone on seagrass beds, but also at greater depths, usually feeding on algae and sponges (omnivore-grazer). Minimum recorded depth is 0 m. Maximum recorded depth is 20 m.

Subspecies
Muracypraea mus bicornis Sowerby, 1870
Muracypraea mus mus Linnaeus, 1758
Muracypraea mus tristensis Petuch, 1987

References

 WoRMS
 Burgess, C.M. (1985) Cowries of the World. Gordon Verhoef, Seacomber Publications, South Africa, Cape Town. XIV + 289 pp. page(s): 168
 Lorenz F. & Hubert A. (2000) - A guide to worldwide cowries. Edition 2. Hackenheim: Conchbooks. 584 pp

External links

 Biolib
 
 Paleo Database
 Flmnh
 Muracypraea mus subspecies

Cypraeidae
Gastropods described in 1758
Taxa named by Carl Linnaeus